The Obskaya–Bovanenkovo Line is a  railway line in northern Russia, built and owned and operated by Gazprom. It was opened for traffic in 2010 and was built for the gas fields around Bovanenkovo on the Yamal Peninsula, the Yamal project. In February 2011, it was extended to the Karskaya station, making it 572 km long. Like most railways in the former Russian Empire, it is built to Russian gauge.

The railway contains a  bridge, the Yuribey Bridge. It starts at Obskaya, branching off the Salekhard–Igarka Railway.

Another plan is to extend the railway to the Yamal LNG installations at Sabetta.

Northernmost railway
Plans to construct a more northerly railway to serve the Baffinland Iron Mine in Canada have been deferred. Before completion of the railway to Bovanenkovo, the most northerly railway in Russia was the Norilsk railway. Due to all Russian railways being built to gauges other than standard gauge (usually Russian gauge, but a few narrow gauge lines also exist), the lines in Norway can however continue to claim being the northernmost standard gauge railway.

References

External links
«Газпром» | Бованенковская железная дорога (Blog with nice photos)

Railway lines in Russia
Rail transport in Yamalo-Nenets Autonomous Okrug
Railway lines opened in 2010